The Chilean minelayer Colo Colo was a minelayer purchased from Finland in 1919. The ship entered service with the Chilean Navy in 1920.  She remained a part of the Chilean Navy until 1930 when the ship was sold and renamed Toqui. The ship sank in 1944.

Service history
In 1919 the Chilean Government bought 4 incomplete ships captured by Finland on slipways in 1918 after Russia's withdrawal from World War I in 1917. The ships Chibis, Kulik, Strizh and Bekas were in Helsinki under construction for the Russian Empire.

The ships were renamed Colo Colo, Elicura, Leucotón and Orompello, completed and in 1920 passed to England to receive minelaying equipment at the J. Samuel White shipyard. They arrived in Chile on 26 October 1920.

During the Chilean naval mutiny of 1931 Colo Colo (mutineers) chased the submarine  (government) and forced it to enter to the Biobio River.

She was sold in 1930 and renamed Toqui. She sank on 25 February 1944 off Huasco.

See also
 List of decommissioned ships of the Chilean Navy

References

External links
 Chilean Navy website, Colo Colo
 Chilean Navy website, Elicura
 Chilean Navy website, Orompello
 Chilean Navy website, Leucotón

Auxiliary ships of the Chilean Navy
1917 ships